English Village is a British-built luxury housing compound located in western Erbil, Kurdistan Region, Iraq. The compound contains identical villas, the vast majority of which are used as offices for companies. English Village is among several modern compounds in Erbil named after Western countries, such as American Village, Italian Village and German Village. It represents an economic boom that occurred in Erbil at the turn of the 2010s.

History 
The compound was built by a consortium named Hawler Housing Project (Hawler is Kurdish for Erbil), following a 2004 initiative from the UK Foreign Office Trade and Industry Department, in cooperation with British property development company J.M. Jones & Sons. Construction and sales began in early 2006. The compound cost  to develop. By 2011, companies had started slowly moving into newer compounds with cheaper rent prices. 

In July 2019, an illicit gambling scheme operating out of a casino in English Village was shut down by the Kurdish security forces.

Characteristics 
Each villa has  of floor space on two floors and contains five bedrooms, full air conditioning, fitted kitchens and two bathrooms with combined Eastern and Western toilets. The villas are reported to have a reliable electricity supply and sanitation system, in contrast to other areas of Erbil and Iraq. The compound also contains a school and five-storey shopping centre.

Demographics 
The complex is populated mostly by upper-class locals, foreign businesspeople and aid workers. The vast majority of villas in the complex are used as offices for companies.

In the media 
In 2019, GQ Australia featured English Village in a photography series on the urban development of Erbil.

References 

Erbil
Populated places in Erbil Governorate
Kurdish settlements in Erbil Governorate